Thou Shalt Not Kill (Italian: Non uccidere) is an Italian television crime drama starring Miriam Leone. It aired in Italy on Rai 3 in Italy for season one in 2017. Season 2 premiered on Rai's streaming service RaiPlay. Each season included 12 episodes. In the U.S. and U.K, the series is shown on Walter Presents. This series aired on American PBS stations in fall 2019, and again in 2021.

Synopsis
Thou Shalt Not Kill is an Italian detective drama series set in Turin. Valeria Ferro investigates murders with the help of her colleagues in the police department whilst also unravelling her family’s past. Valeria’s mother spent time in prison for killing her husband when Valeria was a child.

The series also revolves around Valeria’s relationships with family and her work colleagues, which can sometimes overlap, particularly due to the fact that her mother was convicted by the same police department.

Cast
Miriam Leone: Valeria Ferro
Monica Guerritore: Lucia Ferro
Matteo Martari: Andrea Russo
Thomas Trabacchi: Giorgio Lombardi
Riccardo Lombardo: Gerardo Mattei
Luca Terracciano: Luca Rinaldi
Davide Iacopini: Giacomo Ferro
Viola Sartoretto: Michela Ferro
Gigio Alberti: Giulio Ferro
Crystal De Glaudi: Costanza Ferro

Distribution and number of series

This was first shown on Rai 3 in Italy for seasons one and two, which each contained 12 episodes, beginning in 2017. Season two premiered on Rai's streaming service RaiPlay. In the U.S. and U.K, the series is shown on Walter Presents. The show first appeared on American PBS stations in fall 2019, in Italian with English subtitles on screen.

References

External links
Thou Shalt Not Kill Non uccidere (original title) at the IMDB

2015 Italian television series debuts
2010s Italian television series
RAI original programming